This is a list of members of the Western Australian Legislative Assembly from 1989 to 1993:

Notes
 On 26 April 1990, the Labor member for Maylands, former Premier Peter Dowding, resigned. Labor candidate Judy Edwards won the resulting by-election on 26 May 1990.
 On 26 April 1990, the Labor member for Fremantle, former Deputy Premier David Parker, resigned. Labor candidate Jim McGinty won the resulting by-election on 26 May 1990.
 On 29 September 1989, the Liberal member for Darling Range, Ian Thompson, left his party and served out his term as an independent.
 On 28 June 1990, the Liberal member for Cottesloe, Bill Hassell, resigned. Liberal candidate Colin Barnett won the resulting by-election on 11 August 1990.
 Three members left the Labor Party in 1991 for differing reasons to sit as independents—Pam Buchanan (Ashburton) on 1 February 1991 due to anger over Premier Carmen Lawrence's handling of a cabinet reshuffle, Dr Ian Alexander (Perth) on 4 March 1991 due to his views on the WA Inc scandal, and Frank Donovan (Morley) on 9 October 1991 due to Bob Hawke's role in supporting the Gulf War.
 On 28 February 1991, the Labor member for Geraldton, Jeff Carr, resigned. Liberal candidate Bob Bloffwitch won the resulting by-election on 13 April 1991.
 On 16 May 1991, the Liberal member for Floreat, Andrew Mensaros, resigned due to ill-health (he died 13 days later). After a considerable drama involving the Liberal preselection for the safe seat, Independent candidate Liz Constable won the resulting by-election on 20 July 1991.
 On 3 March 1992, the Independent (formerly Labor) member for Ashburton, Pam Buchanan, resigned due to ill-health (she died four weeks later). Labor candidate Fred Riebeling won the resulting by-election on 4 April 1992.

Members of Western Australian parliaments by term